The World Black Pudding Throwing Championships are held annually in Ramsbottom, Greater Manchester, outside the Royal Oak pub on Bridge Street on the second Sunday of September. The event was originally held outside the Corner Pin pub in nearby Stubbins before that pub was closed and converted to offices. Money raised by the event is donated to local good causes.

Local legends claim the tradition dates back to the War of the Roses. Warring factions of the House of Lancaster and the House of York at a battle in Stubbins, Lancashire, in 1455 are said to have run out of ammunition and resorted to throwing food at each other; black pudding from Lancashire and Yorkshire puddings from Yorkshire.

The competition was revived by a pub landlord in 1839, revived again in 1984 by the Stubbins Community Trust. It has been a popular custom in the town ever since, drawing thousands of spectators to watch every year.

Competitors must knock down the most Yorkshire puddings, placed on a 7.6 meter high plinth, by hurling three black puddings at them.

Note: Although the popular title for this competition uses the word, Throwing, the local organizers are attempting to correct this title by using the correct term, Hurling, thus World Black Pudding Hurling Championships. True to the competition rules the Black Pudding is hurled underhand as opposed to thrown overhand.

List of winners
{| class="sortable wikitable"
! 1990 !! Ste Thornley
|-
| 1996 || 
|-
| 2000 || 
|-
| 2001 || 
|-
| 2002 || 
|-
| 2003 || 
|-
| 2004 || 
|-
| 2005 || 
|-
| 2006 || 
|-
| 2007 || 
|-
| 2008 || 
|-
| 2009 || 
|-
| 2010 || 
|-
| 2011 || 
|-
| 2012 || 
|-
| 2013 || 
|-
| 2014 || 
|-
| 2015 || 
|-
| 2016 || 
|-
| 2017 || 
|-
| 2018 || 
|-
| 2019 || 
|-
|2020
|No event
|-
|2021
| Andrew Ferrier
|-
|}

References

Black Pudding
English cuisine
Ramsbottom